Keith Code is an American former motorcycle racer,
writer, and founder of the California Superbike School.
He has been called "arguably the best known and most successful on-track motorcycle instructor in the world".

Rider training

Code founded the California Superbike School in 1980. Code's methodology has been taught to numerous championship winning riders such as Wayne Rainey, James Toseland and Leon Camier. As of 2019, riders who have been trained either at his schools or by him personally have won 60 world and national racing championships. His teaching has been spread all over the world. His California Superbike Schools have operated at over 90 tracks worldwide in 15 countries and have trained 150,000 riders.

In 2006 he was tasked by the United States Marine Corps to design a rider training program that would be effective in reducing serious motorcycle accidents among USMC riders. The program, called Advanced Motorcycle Operator School, is now considered the gold standard of rider training by Marine safety personnel due to its graduates' extraordinary safety record over a four-year period.

Code has invented rider training devices such as the No Body Steering Bike which illustrates the necessity for counter-steering to be used, the Lean and Slide Bike Trainers that train not only good body positioning and visual skills but also allow riders to experience sliding the machine with much reduced possibility of crashing, and the Panic Braking Trainer that allows riders to experience front wheel lock up and learn how to recover from it.

Writing
Code writes a monthly column in Motorcyclist magazine called Code Break. He has also opened a specialized school for racing techniques, called Code R.A.C.E. He has written three books about sportsbike riding and racing techniques, and also one feature length DVD covering the content of his second A Twist of the Wrist book. His works have been translated into Russian, German, Estonian, Greek, Spanish, French, Italian, Japanese, Polish, Dutch and Turkish.

Personal life

Keith Code practices Scientology, and the Church of Scientology has quoted him:

Works

References

External links

 SuperBikeSchool.com

American Scientologists
Writers from California
American motorcycle racers
Year of birth missing (living people)
Living people
Motorcycling writers
Motorcycle trainers